The following lists events that happened during 1904 in the Kingdom of Belgium.

Incumbents
Monarch: Leopold II
Prime Minister: Paul de Smet de Naeyer

Events
 Institut de Droit International awarded the Nobel Peace Prize

April
 17 April – Edmond de Gaiffier d'Hestroy replaces Maurice Joostens as Belgian ambassador to China

May
 1 May – Belgium national football team plays its first international, against France
 21 May – Belgium national football association a founder member of FIFA
 29 May – 1904 Belgian general election

June
 5 June – Provincial elections

October
 29 October – Extradition treaty with Cuba concluded.

Art and architecture

Buildings
 Hôtel Hannon, an Art Nouveau villa in Saint-Gilles, designed by Jules Brunfaut for Édouard Hannon

Publications

Periodicals
 Annuaire de l'Institut de droit international begins publication
 Bulletin des Sociétés Chimiques Belges begins publication
 Het Missiewerk begins publication

Reports and studies
 Casement Report
 E. D. Morel, King Leopold's Rule in Africa

Scholarship
 Jean Capart, Les débuts de l'art en Égypte (Brussels, Vromany)
 G. Des Marez, L'organisation du travail a Bruxelles au XVe siècle (Brussels)
 Maurice De Wulf, Introduction à la philosophie néoscolastique.
 Joseph Van den Gheyn, Catalogue des manuscrits de la Bibliothèque royale de Belgique, vol. 4.

Guides
 First Michelin Guide for Belgium published
 Touring Club Belgium publishes road map of Belgium

Literary writing
 Henry Carton de Wiart, La cité ardente
 Émile Verhaeren, Les tendresses premières, illustrated by Théo van Rysselberghe (Brussels, Edmond Deman)

Births
 Louis Pevernagie, painter (died 1970)
 6 January – Aimée Bologne-Lemaire, activist (died 1998)
 25 January – Albert De Roocker, Olympic fencer
 9 February – Karel Bossart, engineer (died 1975)
 10 February – Henri Hébrant, boxer
 13 February – Lucien Debleyser, boxer
 21 February – Armand Preud'homme, composer (died 1986) 
 2 March – Jan Mertens, cyclist (died 1964)
 30 March
 Marguerite Acarin, dance artist (died 1999)
 Edgar P. Jacobs, comic book creator (died 1987)
 8 April – Piet Vermeylen, politician (died 1991)
 15 April – René Lagrou, Nazi collaborator (died 1969)
 9 May – Pol Demeuter, motorcycle racer (died 1934)
 12 May – Adolphe Groscol, Olympic athlete (died 1985)
 17 May – Fernand Dineur, cartoonist (died 1956)
 30 June – Edith Kiel, film maker (died 1993) 
 8 July – Roger Motz, politician (died 1964) 
 10 July – Jules Herremans, Olympic athlete (died 1974)
 16 July – Leo Joseph Suenens, Archbishop of Mechelen-Brussel (died 1996)
 27 July – Omer Taverne, cyclist (died 1981)
 17 August – Raymond Jeener, biologist (died 1995)
 18 September – Paul Van den Broeck, sportsman
 6 October – Victor Larock, politician (died 1977)
 23 October – Maximilien de Furstenberg, prelate (died 1988)
 19 November – Louise Janson-Scheidt, writer (died 1997)
 12 December – Jacques Van Melkebeke, artist and writer (died 1983)

Deaths
 Robert Vinçotte (born 1844), engineer
 15 January – Eduard Lassen (born 1830), composer
 23 January – Gédéon Bordiau (born 1832), architect
 26 March – Ferdinand Pauwels (born 1830), painter
 21 April – Piatus of Mons (born 1815), theologian
 10 May – Henry Morton Stanley (born 1841), explorer of Congo
 9 June – Hendrik Frans Schaefels (born 1827), painter
 12 June – Camille of Renesse-Breidbach (born 1836), entrepreneur
 15 August – Frans de Potter (born 1834), writer
 19 November – August Snieders (born 1825), journalist
 13 December – Henri Van Cutsem (born 1839), patron of the arts
 24 December – Julien Dillens (born 1849), sculptor

References

 
1900s in Belgium
Belgium
Belgium
Years of the 20th century in Belgium